Tyson & Brother v. Banton, 273 U.S. 418 (1927), is a US Supreme Court case, concerning the constitutionality of the State of New York imposing restrictions on the price of resold theatre tickets. It has been reversed but is notable for the dissent of Oliver Wendell Holmes.

Background
A New York state statute limited the resale price of theatre tickets to fifty cents over the initial box office price.

Opinion of the Court
The majority declared the statute was unconstitutional on grounds of the Fourteenth Amendment, but Oliver Wendell Holmes, Louis Brandeis, Harlan F. Stone, and Edward T. Sanford dissented.

See also
List of United States Supreme Court cases, volume 273

References

External links

United States Supreme Court cases
United States Supreme Court cases of the Taft Court
United States substantive due process case law
1927 in United States case law
Tickets